Bagh-e Keshmir Rural District is a rural district (dehestan) in Salehabad County, Razavi Khorasan Province, Iran. At the 2006 census, its population was 10,011, in 2,208 families.  The rural district has 21 villages.

References 

Rural Districts of Razavi Khorasan Province

Salehabad County